Heliura stolli is a moth of the subfamily Arctiinae. It was described by Rothschild in 1912. It is found in Brazil.

References

 Natural History Museum Lepidoptera generic names catalog

Arctiinae
Moths described in 1912